Bhagwat Bhau Nagpure was the Indian National Congress MLA for Lanji, Balaghat district, Madhya Pradesh, India.

References

Indian National Congress politicians from Madhya Pradesh